This is a list of NGC objects 5001–6000 from the New General Catalogue (NGC). The astronomical catalogue is composed mainly of star clusters, nebulae, and galaxies. Other objects in the catalogue can be found in the other subpages of the list of NGC objects.

The constellation information in these tables is taken from The Complete New General Catalogue and Index Catalogue of Nebulae and Star Clusters by J. L. E. Dreyer, which was accessed using the "VizieR Service". Galaxy types are identified using the NASA/IPAC Extragalactic Database. The other data of these tables are from the SIMBAD Astronomical Database unless otherwise stated.

5001–5100

5101–5200

5201–5300

5301–5400

5401–5500

5501–5600

5601–5700

5701–5800

5801–5900

5901–6000

See also
 Lists of astronomical objects

References

 6
NGC objects 5001-6000